Wacław Starzyński (8 October 1910 – 20 August 1976) was a Polish cyclist. He competed in the individual and team road race events at the 1936 Summer Olympics.

References

External links
 

1910 births
1976 deaths
Polish male cyclists
Olympic cyclists of Poland
Cyclists at the 1936 Summer Olympics
People from Pułtusk
Sportspeople from Masovian Voivodeship